Cass Technical High School (simply referred to as Cass Tech) is a magnet high school in Midtown Detroit, Michigan, United States. It was established in 1907 and is part of the Detroit Public Schools Community District. It is named after Lewis Cass.

Until 1977, Cass was Detroit's only magnet school and the only non-neighborhood enrollment school in Detroit. It remains one of few magnet schools in Detroit. Entrance is based on test scores and middle school grades. Students are required to choose a curriculum path—roughly equivalent to a college "major" —in the ninth grade. Areas of study include among others arts and communication, business management and marketing, engineering and manufacturing, human services, and science and arts.

History 

The school was founded in 1907 on the third floor of Cass Union School on Grand Union Avenue, subsequently moving to its own wing. After that school was mostly destroyed by a fire, a building for Cass Tech was built on the site and opened in October 1912, but was soon overcrowded. A new building nearby on Second Avenue was designed in Collegiate Gothic style by Malcolmson and Higginbotham with Albert Kahn as construction architect; construction began in 1916, the cornerstone was laid in 1917, and after delays caused by World War I austerity measures, the building opened in September 1922. It had a capacity of 3,600 students and was connected to the High School of Commerce, which opened earlier the same year in Cass Tech's former building, by Victory Memorial Arch, a pedestrian bridge over Main Street that was a memorial to students killed in the war. By 1942 the school had more than 4,500 students and was the largest in Michigan. In 1985, an addition on the south side was opened, designed by Albert Kahn & Associates, which included performing arts facilities, a new pool, and a student cafeteria, and a wing of the building was remodeled for computer and business classes. Departments in the 1922 building were grouped by floor; facilities included a foundry and machine shops that were used for training by Ford outside school hours, and the auditorium was used as a practice hall by the Detroit Symphony Orchestra. The 1922 building was added to the National Register of Historic Places in March 2011.

In 2008, due to declining enrollment, teacher staffing was reduced and some classes that were not very popular with students were removed.

Academics 

Cass offers over twenty advanced placement courses including language composition, history, chemistry, calculus, and physics. Cass Tech students' strong academic performances draw recruiters from across the country, including Ivy League representatives eager to attract the top minority applicants. However, in 2019, Cass Tech was not among the 78 Michigan high schools with the highest average SAT scores. In 2021, U.S. News ranked Cass Tech 84th among Michigan high schools, and reported a 62.9% percentile score on the SAT.

Awards 
In 1984, Cass Tech was honored by the U.S. Department of Education among 262 schools that should "shine as inspirational model for others," a list that included public and private schools.

In 2006, Cass represented DPS at the National Academic Games Olympics and won the Team Sweepstakes award.

Music

Harp and vocal 
The school's Harp program was established in 1925.

Bands 
There are beginner, intermediate, advanced and jazz band classes, as well as a marching band. The CTMB (marching band), under the direction of Sharon Allen, has performed for Patti LaBelle, Sinbad, and Jay Z as well as various college and university homecomings. The marching band was also a part of the 2007 Orange Bowl in Miami, Florida, but was not televised. In 2008, the band performed at Texas Southern University. In 2010, the CTMB participated in Norfolk State University's Homecoming and won first place in the McDonald's Battle of the Bands. In 2013 CTMB went to the 2013 inauguration for President Barack Obama.

The concert band program rose to prominence under the direction of Harry Begian, who led the Cass Tech bands from 1947 through 1964. Under his baton, the concert band performed twice at the Mid-West Band and Orchestra Clinic, and played literature at a level far beyond that normally performed by a public high school band, including the Symphony in B-flat by Paul Hindemith and La Fiesta Mexicana by H. Owen Reed.

Athletics

Football 

The Cass Tech Technicians football team (also referred to as the Technicians) is a high school football program in Division 1 Public School League, representing Cass Technical High School.

Cass Tech won the 2011, 2012 and 2016 MHSAA Division I state championships.

Basketball 
 1956 Boys Class A State Champions
 1975 Boys Class A State Champions

Track and field 
Cass Tech's track and field history goes back to 1926 when Eddie Tolan and his teammate Loving won the interscholastic track meet at Northwestern University.  Tolan came to be known as the "Midnight Express". He set world records in the 100-yard dash and 100 meters event and Olympic records in the 100 meters and 200 meters events. He was the first African-American to receive the title of the "world's fastest human" after winning gold medals in the 100 and 200 meters events at the 1932 Summer Olympics in Los Angeles. In March 1935, Tolan won the 75, 100 and 220-yard events at the World Professional Sprint Championships in Melbourne, Australia to become the first man to win both the amateur and professional world sprint championships. In his full career as a sprinter, Tolan won 300 races and lost only 7.

Northwestern Interscholastic Track Meet 
 March 1926: 1st Place – National Champions
 March 1927: 3rd Place
 March 1928: 3rd Place

Campus

Architecture 

A new campus opened in May 2005 in an adjacent lot on Grand River Avenue to the north of the original building.

The former building, including the extension, was left vacant (with classroom fittings and supplies inside). The alumni association announced plans in April 2007 to renovate it as a multi-use center including arts spaces, retail, and residences, but in July 2007 a fire damaged the 1922 section. The school district listed the building for demolition later that year. Demolition began in December 2010 and was completed in August 2011. Over 90% of the material in the building was recycled for other uses or as backfill.

Students

Demographics 
, almost 2,500 students attended Cass Technical High School: 728 students in the ninth grade, 585 students in the tenth grade, 585 in the eleventh grade, and 570 in the twelfth grade. Enrollment in 2018–19 was 2,393.

Ethnicity distribution 
Of the students attending Cass Technical High School in 2010–11, 2,035 (82.5%) of them are Black or African American, 233 (9.4%) are Asian American, 147 (6.0%) are Hispanic or Latino, 28 (1.1%) are Arab, 12 (0.5%) are White, and 7 (0.3%) are American Indian or Alaska Native.

Notable alumni

Art, architecture, design

Arts and entertainment

Business

Educators

Fiction/non-fiction

Journalism/publishing/broadcasting

Law, government, and public policy

Military

Sports

References

External links 
  (Archive from 2000 onwards)
 Cass Tech High School at Detroiturbex.com
 Cass Technical photos circa 2009 at Silentbuildings.com

Midtown Detroit
High schools in Detroit
Magnet schools in Michigan
Public high schools in Michigan
Educational institutions established in 1907
1907 establishments in Michigan